Essmat Mansour El Sayed (born November 20, 1986) is an Egyptian weightlifter who competed in the Women's 58 kg at the 2005 World Championships in Doha, Qatar and reached the 6th spot with 204 kg in total. In 2009, she established six new African weightlifting records. She competed in the women's -69 kg at the 2012 Summer Olympics, finishing seventh. She was born in Alexandria.

References

1986 births
Living people
Olympic weightlifters of Egypt
Weightlifters at the 2012 Summer Olympics
Egyptian female weightlifters
Sportspeople from Alexandria
African Games gold medalists for Egypt
African Games medalists in weightlifting
Mediterranean Games gold medalists for Egypt
Mediterranean Games silver medalists for Egypt
Mediterranean Games medalists in weightlifting
Competitors at the 2007 All-Africa Games
Competitors at the 2005 Mediterranean Games
Competitors at the 2009 Mediterranean Games
Competitors at the 2013 Mediterranean Games
20th-century Egyptian women
21st-century Egyptian women